The men's light welterweight boxing competition at the 2012 Olympic Games in London was held from 31 July to 11 August at the ExCeL Exhibition Centre.

Twenty-eight boxers from 28 nations competed.

Competition format
The competition consisted of a single-elimination tournament. Bronze medals were awarded to both semi-final losers. Bouts were three rounds of three minutes each.

Schedule 
All times are British Summer Time (UTC+1)

Results

Finals

Top half

Bottom half

References

Boxing at the 2012 Summer Olympics
Men's events at the 2012 Summer Olympics